Ask Aspel was a British television series produced by the BBC and hosted by Michael Aspel. The format of the show, which first ran from 1970 until 1973, featured a well-known guest who answered questions sent in by viewers, posed by Aspel on their behalf. The questioning was interspersed by requests from viewers who would write in asking to see repeats of their favourite clips from BBC programmes. At least one clip featured the featured guest of the week. The show returned from 1976 until 1981.

Guests
(known guests according to the Radio Times listings)

October 16, 1970: Eric Morecambe & Ernie Wise
September 17, 1971: Jack Wild
October 8, 1971: Percy Thrower
October 15, 1971: Ann Moore
October 22, 1971: Cliff Richard
October 29, 1971: Johnny Morris
November 5, 1971: Leonard Nimoy
November 19, 1971: Ian Johnson (Co-host Basil Brush)
November 26, 1971: Terry Scott
December 3, 1971: Jackie Stewart
December 10, 1971: Stratford Johns
December 17, 1971: Jimmy Edwards
December 31, 1971: Compilation of the series
February 20, 1972: Brian Rix
February 27, 1972: Eric Morecambe & Ernie Wise (Possible repeat)
March 5, 1972: Jon Pertwee
March 12, 1972: Chay Blyth
March 26, 1972: Tony Blackburn
July 21, 1972: Patrick Moore
July 28, 1972: Michael Bentine
August 4, 1972: Lulu
August 11, 1972: Ben Murphy
August 18, 1972: Kenneth Williams
August 25, 1972: Una Stubbs
September 1, 1972: Peter Noone
September 8, 1972: Basil D'Oliveira
October 1, 1972: David Cassidy
October 8, 1972: Bill Tidy
October 15, 1972: Tim Rice
October 22, 1972: Arthur Lowe
October 29, 1972: Peter Cushing
November 19, 1972: June Whitfield
December 3, 1972: Ian McNaught-Davis
January 14, 1973: Simon Ward
January 21, 1973: Jeffery Boswall
January 28, 1973: Morag Hood
February 4, 1973: John Williams
February 11, 1973: Miss World 1972 Belinda Green
February 18, 1973: Richard Meade
February 25, 1973: Gilbert O'Sullivan
September 23, 1973: David Essex
September 30, 1973: Geoffrey Boycott
October 14, 1973: Antoinette Sibley & Anthony Dowell
October 21, 1973: Showjumper Alison Dawes
October 28, 1973: Michael Bond
November 4, 1973: Donny Osmond, Jimmy Osmond & Alan Osmond
November 11, 1973: Gordon Banks
November 18, 1973: Bert Foord & Elizabeth Archard
December 2, 1973: Deryck Guyler
December 9, 1973: Roy Castle 
March 17, 1974: John Cleese
March 24, 1974: Mike Hope & Albie Keen
March 31, 1974: Nina Bawden
April 7, 1974: Jimmy Hill
April 28, 1974: Diver Beverley Williams 
May 5, 1974: Percy Edwards
May 12, 1974: Richard Pitman
June 2, 1974: David Cassidy (Possible repeat)
June 9, 1974: Cilla Black
July 7, 1974: Arthur Askey
July 14, 1974: Tony Greig
July 28, 1974: Highlights from the series
August 18, 1974: Rick Wakeman
August 25, 1974: Rod Hull & Emu
September 1, 1974: James Hunt
September 8, 1974: The Goodies
September 22, 1974: Debbie Johnsey
August 3, 1977: Rolf Harris
August 10, 1977: Barry Sheene
August 17, 1977: Eric Morecambe & Ernie Wise 
August 24, 1977: Zoo vet David Taylor
August 31, 1977: Penelope Keith
September 14, 1977: Lucina Prior-Palmer
September 21, 1977: Roger Moore
September 28, 1977: All-round angler Ian Gillespie
October 5, 1977: Roald Dahl
August 15, 1978: Tim Rice
August 22, 1978: Christopher Timothy
August 29, 1977: James Burke
September 5, 1978: Kate Bush
September 12, 1978: Sonia Lannaman
September 26, 1978: Clare Francis
May 15, 1979: Isla St Clair
May 22, 1979: Lena Zavaroni
May 29, 1979: Peter Robinson of the Royal Society for the Protection of Birds 
June 5, 1979: Andrew Sachs
June 12, 1979: Paul Darrow
June 19, 1979: Tracy Austin
June 26, 1979: Graham Bilbrough of Child
July 3, 1979: Michael Palin
May 20, 1980: Mark Hamill
May 27, 1980: Trevor Brooking
June 3, 1980: Andrew Lloyd Webber
June 10, 1980: Geoff Capes
June 17, 1980: Barbara Woodhouse
June 24, 1980: BA Robertson
July 1, 1980: Lynn Seymour
July 8, 1980: Dan Maskell
July 15, 1980: Lalla Ward
July 22, 1980: BBC Young Musician of the Year, Nicholas Daniel
July 19, 1980: Esther Rantzen
June 2, 1981: Mark Wing-Davey
June 9, 1981: Paul Daniels
June 16, 1981: Toyah Willcox
June 23, 1981: Wilf Lunn
June 30, 1981: Lynn-Holly Johnson
July 7, 1981: David Bellamy
July 14, 1981: Linsey Macdonald
July 21, 1981: Paul Nicholas

References
Notes

Citations

1970s British television series
1970 British television series debuts